Hengersberg is a municipality in Bavaria in  the district Deggendorf.

Districts 
Districts are: Hengersberg, Altenufer, Anzenberg, Boxbach, Buch, Edermanning, Emming, Erkerding, Erlachhof, Eusching, Frohnhofen, Furth, Grubmühle, Heiming, Hinterweinberg, Holzberg, Holzerreuth, Hörgolding, Hörpling, Hub, Hubmühle, Hütting, Kading, Killersberg, Klausberg, Lapferding, Leebbergheim, Lichtenöd, Lohof, Manzing, Matzing, Mimming, Mutzenwinkl, Neulust, Nußberg, Oberanzenberg, Oberellenbach, Oberreith, Obersimbach, Pfaffing, Ponau, Rading, Reichersdorf, Reisach, Schlott, Schwanenkirchen, Schwarzach, Sicking, Siederding, Siedersberg, Thannberg, Trainding, Unterellenbach, Unterfrohnstetten, Unterreith, Untersimbach, Viehdorf, Vorderweinberg, Walmering, Waltersdorf, Weickering, Wessenhof, Würzing, Zilling.

History 
Hengersberg was founded 997 as "Helmgeresberg" by Gotthard of Niederalteich.

References 

Deggendorf (district)